Bostick State Prison is a former prison located in Hardwick in Baldwin County, Georgia. It was constructed in the 1950s and converted to a prison in 1987. It closed in May 2010.

Notable inmates
Notable inmates of the prison include:

 Alvin Neelley - convicted murderer

References

Buildings and structures in Baldwin County, Georgia
Defunct prisons in Georgia (U.S. state)
1987 establishments in Georgia (U.S. state)
Buildings and structures completed in the 1950s
2010 disestablishments in Georgia (U.S. state)